Maoritenes cyclobathra is a species of moth of the family Tortricidae. It is found in New Zealand.

The wingspan is 16–18 mm. The forewings are fuscous, tinged with purplish and sprinkled with dark fuscous, as well as suffused with dark ashy fuscous towards the middle of the costa and towards the termen mixed with reddish ochreous and strigulated (finely streaked) with dark fuscous. The hindwings are light grey.

References

Moths described in 1907
Schoenotenini
Endemic fauna of New Zealand
Taxa named by Edward Meyrick
Endemic moths of New Zealand